La Habra High School is a public co-educational high school located in the Orange County, California city of La Habra. Located between the Coyote Hills to the south and Puente Hills to the north, LHHS opened in 1954 and graduated its first class in 1956. It is a California Distinguished High School and has been nominated as a National Blue Ribbon School.  The school is a member of the Fullerton Joint Union High School District. LHHS absorbed a majority of the students from nearby Lowell High School when it closed in June 1980.

Athletics
La Habra's sports teams are known as the Highlanders and are members of the Freeway League in CIF Southern Section.

CIF championships
 Football: 2002, 2003, 2007, 2008, 2009, 2010, 2015
 Girls volleyball: 1989, 1990, 1991, 1998, 2000
Men's soccer: 2007, 2008

Notable alumni

Rusty Anderson, guitarist for Paul McCartney's Band – Macca
Greg Gaines, NFL nose tackle for the Los Angeles Rams
Jennifer Hanson, Miss California, country music artist
Ronnie Hillman, NFL running back
Mark Kostabi, artist
John N. Lotz, Air National Guard Brigadier General
Alan Newman, former professional baseball player, Tampa Bay Rays and Cleveland Indians
Dan Owens, former NFL defensive end who last played for the Detroit Lions
Kyle Peko, NFL nose tackle for the Denver Broncos
Dan Radlauer, composer, arranger 
Anne Ramsay, actress: Hawthorne, A League of Their Own, Mad About You
Bubby Rossman ('10), major league baseball pitcher for the Philadelphia Phillies
Jenny Topping, U.S. Olympic softball player
Chuck Weatherspoon, former NFL running back for Tampa Bay Buccaneers
Darin Toohey, American atmospheric scientist

References

External links
Official Site
Enrollment Count

High schools in Orange County, California
Public high schools in California
1954 establishments in California
Educational institutions established in 1954